RIswan Yusman (born May 30, 1997) is an Indonesian professional footballer who plays as a midfielder.

Club career

Borneo FC
He was signed for Borneo to play in Liga 1 in the 2017 season. Riswan made his debut on 22 April 2017 in a match against Sriwijaya. On 20 May 2017, Riswan scored his first goal for Borneo against Persib Bandung in the 17th minute at the Gelora Bandung Lautan Api Stadium, Bandung.

Persela Lamongan
He was signed for Persela Lamongan to play in Liga 1 in the 2021 season. Riswan made his league debut on 10 September 2021 in a match against Persipura Jayapura at the Wibawa Mukti Stadium, Cikarang.

Career statistics

Club

References

External links
 Riswan Yusman at Soccerway
 Riswan Yusman at Liga Indonesia

1997 births
Living people
Indonesian footballers
Persela Lamongan players
Association football midfielders
People from Ternate
Sportspeople from North Maluku